Roberto Cid Subervi (born 30 August 1993) is a Dominican–American tennis player.

Cid Subervi has a career high ATP singles ranking of 211 achieved on 14 September 2020. He also has a career high ATP doubles ranking of 262, achieved on 19 October 2020. Cid Subervi has won 4 ITF singles titles and 1 ITF doubles title.
 
Cid Subervi has represented Dominican Republic at Davis Cup, where he has a win–loss record of 4–11.

College career 
In 2016, Cid Subervi was ranked no. 2 in the nation in the NCAA Div 1 singles rankings in his last year at University of South Florida. Parterning with Sasha Gozun, he was ranked no. 6 in the nation in the NCAA Div 1 doubles rankings in 2015.

He reached the Quarterfinals of the 2016 NCAA Division I Men's Tennis Championships in singles before losing to the eventual champion Mackenzie McDonald from UCLA and had wins over top ranked players such as Dominik Kopfer from Tulane, Cameron Norrie from TCU and Ryan Shane from Virginia. In 2014 he had also made the Quarterfinals of the 2014 NCAA Division I Men's Tennis Championships in singles defeating No. 1 player in the nation Clay Thompson from UCLA.

Singles performance timeline 

Current through the 2022 Davis Cup.

Challenger and Futures/World Tennis Finals

Singles: 16 (7–9)

Doubles: 5 (2–3)

References

External links 
 
 
 

1993 births
Living people
Dominican Republic male tennis players
American male tennis players
Sportspeople from Santo Domingo
Tennis players from Tampa, Florida
University of South Florida alumni
Dominican Republic emigrants to the United States
Tennis players at the 2019 Pan American Games
Central American and Caribbean Games medalists in tennis
Central American and Caribbean Games gold medalists for the Dominican Republic
Central American and Caribbean Games silver medalists for the Dominican Republic
Tennis players at the 2015 Pan American Games
Pan American Games competitors for the Dominican Republic
South Florida Bulls athletes
College men's tennis players in the United States